The Lodovica World Tour (also known as LodoLive2015) was the first solo concert tour by Italian singer, actress and host Lodovica Comello, in support of her first two solo studio albums, Universo (2013) and Mariposa (2015). Officially announced in May 2014, it traveled across Italy, Spain, Portugal, France, Belgium and Poland. It began on February 1, 2015 in Rome, Italy, with two sold-out shows and concluded on October 25, 2015 in Naples, Italy.

Background 
The tour was announced by the singer on May 13, 2014, when the first two Italian dates were confirmed: Turin and Naples. The next month was announced the Rome concert scheduled for February 1, 2015, which opens the tour. In addition, a website is launched where fans can vote on the locations where they want to see the concert between European cities, Latin America and North America as well as some Western Asian countries and cities of Russia. Votes, which were opened in May, ended in June 2014.
In June Milan, Palermo and Catania were added to concerts already confirmed, while in July was announced Bari. The following months were announced concerts in Padua, Rende, Pescara, Lecce and Florence.

To prepare for the performances, Lodovica frequented singing lessons with Alessandro Formenti from December 2014 until the following February. During the shows were presented songs from both the albums, the first, Universo, and the second, Mariposa; In addition to a medley taken from the series in which Comello recited, the soap opera Violetta.
The concerts of February 2015 in Rome and Milan reached a double sold-out. In the same month new dates were announced in Pordenone, Udine and Bologna and all Portuguese, Spanish and French dates.  The dates of Udine, Catanzaro, Rende and Naples made sold-out.

In April, the Lodovica World Tour also stopped in Brussels. In addition, it was announced that the tour would also go to Argentina, Chile, Venezuela, Uruguay, Mexico, Russia, Hungary, Romania and Poland. For unknown reasons, no concerts were made in all the countries mentioned, except for Poland. Spanish dates scheduled for April in Bilbao, Zaragoza and Valencia were canceled for unknown reasons. After the concert of May 5 in Madrid, the tour stopped for more than a month. On June 26, the tour resumed in the birthplace of the singer, San Daniele del Friuli, and two days later it was in Warsaw for a new and unique date in Poland.
During the summer, new dates were confirmed in Mondragone, Rome, Milan, Roccella Jonica, Diamante and Naples. However, the concerts scheduled for Roccella Jonica, Diamante and Roma respectively on August 7, 8, and October 25 were canceled at the end of July.

Setlist 
The setlist is the same for all concerts. The only change can be made for songs in which exists an Italian and a Spanish version.
 Opening
 Universo (acoustic)
 La Cosa Más Linda
 La Historia
 Sòlo Música
 Un posto libero
 Una Nueva Estrella
 Otro Día Más
 No voy a caer
 Vado (or Vuelvo)
 Violetta's song medley (Veo Veo, Hoy somos más, Ven y canta or Vieni e canta, Aprendí a Decir Adiós)
 Ci vediamo quando è buio
 Sin usar palabras
 Un viaggio intorno al mondo
 Crazy Love
 Para siempre
 Libro bianco (or Historia blanca)
 I Only Want to Be with You
 Il mio amore appeso a un filo (or Mi amor pende de un hilo)
 Todo el resto no cuenta
 Universo
 We are family

Dates

Cancelled shows

References

2015 concert tours
Concert tours of Europe